Brendon Ephia Tuuta (born 29 April 1965) is a New Zealand former rugby league footballer of Māori (Ngāti Mutunga) and Moriori descent.

He was known as "the baby-faced assassin" and had a reputation as a brawler.

Background
He is related to Lewis Brown.

Early years
Originally from the Chatham Islands, Tuuta played much of his youth league for Canterbury.

Tuuta withdrew from the New Zealand Māori squad for the 1986 Pacific Cup.

He was a New Zealand international between 1989 and 1995 and played at the 1995 Rugby League World Cup. During his début in 1989 he was involved in an incident where it was claimed he kneed Paul Vautin. At the end of the 1989 season he toured England with the Kiwis and played in Featherstone for the first time.

Playing career
Tuuta first played professionally when he played for the Western Suburbs Magpies in the New South Wales Rugby League premiership between 1989 and 1990.

He then moved to the Featherstone Rovers in England, playing in the second division. In 1993 he was suspended for six matches for breaking Nigel Heslop's jaw with a punch. He played  in the Rovers' 20–16 victory over Workington Town in the 1992–93 Division Two Premiership Final at Old Trafford, Manchester on 19 May 1993.

Tuuta was a Canterbury representative and famously returned to New Zealand for the 1993 provincial grand final where Canterbury upset Auckland, earning the man of the match award that day.

During the 1995 Australian season, he returned to play for the Western Reds, before signing for the Castleford Tigers (Heritage № 724) for the English 1995/96 season.

Tuuta joined the Warrington Wolves for the 1998 season but struggled with knee problems. Despite deciding to retire after 1998 he reconsidered and returned to the Featherstone Rovers for one more season.

Honours
Tuuta is a Featherstone Rovers' Hall of Fame inductee.

References

External links
World Cup 1995 details
Profile at thecastlefordtigers.co.uk

Sources
 
 

1965 births
Living people
Canterbury rugby league team players
Castleford Tigers players
Featherstone Rovers players
Halswell Hornets players
Hornby Panthers players
New Zealand Māori rugby league players
New Zealand national rugby league team players
New Zealand rugby league players
Rugby league halfbacks
Rugby league locks
South Island rugby league team players
Warrington Wolves players
Western Reds players
Western Suburbs Magpies players
Ngāti Mutunga people
Moriori people